A not-for-profit or non-for-profit organization (NFPO) is a legal entity that does not distribute surplus funds to its members and is formed to fulfill specific objectives. A NFPO does not earn profit for its owners, as any revenue generated by its activities must be put back into the organization.

While not-for-profit organizations and non-profit organizations are distinct legal entities, the terms are sometimes used interchangeably. A NFPO must be differentiated from a non-profit organization (NPO) as it may not be formed explicitly for the public good as an NPO must be, and NFPOs are considered "recreational organizations", meaning that they do not operate with the goal of generating revenue as opposed to NPOs.

Functions 
A NFPO does not have the same obligation as a NPO to serve the public good, and as such it may be used to apply for tax-exempt status as an organization that serves its members and does not have the goal of generating profit. An example of this is a sports club, which exists for the enjoyment of its members and thus would function well as a NFPO, with revenue being re-invested into improving the organization. 

These organizations typically file for tax exemption in the United States under section 501(c)(7) of the Internal Revenue Code as social clubs. Common ventures for which NFPOs are established include:

 Charities
 Sports clubs
 Foundations
 Private schools
 Universities
 Museums
 Churches
 Social welfare organisations

See also 

 501(c) organization
 Community organization
 Fundraising
 Nonprofit organization
 Mutual organization
 Non-commercial activity
 Non-governmental organization
 Nonprofit organization laws by jurisdiction
 Non-profit organizations and access to public information
 Non-profit technology
 Public-benefit nonprofit corporation
 Supporting organization (charity)
 United States non-profit laws
 Voluntary sector

References 

Types of organization